Erra can refer to:

 Erra (god), a Babylonian god
 Erra, Estonia, a settlement in Sonda Parish, Ida-Viru County, Estonia
 Erra, the purported home planet of the pleiadean aliens described by ufologist Billy Meier
 Pizzo Erra, a mountain in Switzerland
 Giancarlo Erra, founder of the Italian rock band Nosound
 Erra-Pater, an astrologer
 Erra (band), an American metalcore band
 Erra (album), their fifth studio album
 Erra (Kakatiya dynasty), a 10th century Indian ruler

ERRA may refer to:

 Enterprise and Regulatory Reform Act 2013
 Energy Regulators Regional Association
 Earthquake Reconstruction and Rehabilitation Authority